Manchu platform shoes refers to the traditional high platform shoes worn by Manchu women which appeared in the early Qing dynasty and continued to be worn even in the late Qing dynasty.

Construction and design

Materials 
The lower portion of the shoe was a high platform heel which was made out of wood while the upper portion shoe was made of fabric. The sole was padded with several layers of cotton which could have allowed the shoes to be worn indoor or only when there were special events. The right and the left were interchangeable.

Shapes 

 The  was in the shape of flowerpot. The shoe had thick soles which would reduce in thickness at the toe and the heel regions.
 The  was horse-hoof in shape. The shoes were elevated with a piece of wood with concave sides which were attached to the soles of the shoe.

History 

Making shoes out of wood has been a tradition craft by the ancestors of the Manchu. According to folk stories, the thick-soled shoe first appeared when a goddess decided to keep off insects and dust when she faced a situation where she had to walk in the mud. Another legend associate the creation of the platform shoes to Princess Duoluo Ganzhu who ordered her soldiers to use wooden stilts to cross the marshes; this invention allowed the soldiers to launch a surprise attack and to win their capital back. Since then, Manchu women wore the high, stilt-like platform shoes.

When the Manchu conquered China in the Qing dynasty, they forbade Manchu women from binding their feet like the Han Chinese women. It is sometimes suggested that the Manchu platforms shoes were used to imitate the gait of the Han Chinese women with bound feet. However, it is also suggested that the use of high platform shoes is not influenced by the Han Chinese but the results of the living conditions adaptation in the Northeast regions.

In the mid 19th century, the Manchu women's set of attire was composed of the high platform shoe, the Manchu robe, and the liangbatou. In the late Qing dynasty, Manchu women eventually did practice some kind of loose foot binding, called  for a short duration of time (only 1 month) in order to compress the feet in a narrow, knife-life shape under the influence of the Han Chinese.

Gallery

See also 

 Chinese clothing
 Cheongsam
 Liangbatou
 Qizhuang – Manchu clothing
 Hanfu

References 

17th-century fashion
18th-century fashion
19th-century fashion
20th-century fashion
Chinese traditional clothing
Qing clothing